George Meister (January, 1854 - December 27, 1928) was an American professional baseball player. A third baseman, he played part of one season in Major League Baseball for the 1884 Toledo Blue Stockings of the American Association.

External links

Major League Baseball third basemen
Toledo Blue Stockings players
Fort Wayne Hoosiers players
Omaha Omahogs players
Keokuk Hawkeyes players
Brockton (minor league baseball) players
Minneapolis Millers (baseball) players
Wilkes-Barre Barons (baseball) players
Allentown Peanuts players
Jackson Jaxons players
Grand Rapids (minor league baseball) players
Grand Rapids Shamrocks players
Dayton (minor league baseball) players
19th-century baseball players
1854 births
1928 deaths